, real name , is a former executive of Hudson Soft.

Biography

Joining Hudson Soft
While Toshiyuki Takahashi worked at a supermarket, he decided to invest in a Sharp brand computer. Since the investment was substantial, Toshiyuki decided to learn programming with the BASIC language. At the same time, a friend of his was interviewed at Hudson Soft and invited him to come. The CEO recruited Toshiyuki for his "energy".

Career at Hudson soft
Toshiyuki Takahashi was primarily employed to sell computer software to resellers. He helped programmers with his programming skills after finishing his workday. After a year, he transferred to the marketing division. He convinced resellers to market Hudson Soft's first game for the Famicom: Lode Runner. Due to the success of his support, he became responsible for writing a book to learn BASIC with Family BASIC.

Thereafter he ran a section devoted to the Famicom and tips related to Hudson Soft games in the CoroCoro Comic. Following the success of this column, the Shogakukan publishing house ceded stage time to the presentation of Championship Lode Runner at a festival. Toshiyuki Takahashi was appointed to present the game, and practiced to know the game by heart. It was very popular with the public (mainly made up of children).

This success pushed Hudson Soft to organize tournaments dedicated to young audiences on the company's video games, the Hudson Caravan.

Gaining popularity
In August 1985, Toshiyuki Takahashi joined the Ohayō Studio team in which he presented games from Hudson Soft once a week. The show was watched by many middle school students and Toshiyuki Takahashi gained much popularity. The same year the first Hudson Caravans were organized. These were tournaments organized in several Japanese cities in which 250 young people attempt to achieve the best score. These tournaments were presented by Toshiyuki Takahashi and he used the nickname Takahashi Meijin. The popularity of Takahashi kept growing, and many derivative products emerged, such as a cartoon (with Bug-tte Honey), in manga, in film (in GAME KING) and in video games (with Adventure Island and Takahashi Meijin no Bug-tte Honey).

2000s
In 1999, Toshiyuki Takahashi transferred to a new branch of Hudson Soft dedicated to card games, Future Bee Cards. In 2003, he was appointed communication manager and in 2006, he was awarded the title of Meijin by his company.

On May 31, 2011, he left Hudson and joined Getcha Communications on June 1, 2011. He cited the disappearance of consumer games from Hudson's operations as the reason for his departure from Hudson. After negotiations with Hudson, he was allowed to continue to use the name "Takahashi Meijin."

16 shot per second 
Takahashi became famous for his fast trigger finger speed of 16 shots per second during the 1980s and is particularly known for his use of this skill in the game Star Soldier and the Family Computer version of  Star Force. In an interview with Katsuhiro Harada, the producer of the Tekken series, he revealed that his trigger finger speed was actually filmed and counted to be 17 shots per second, but he rounded down to 16 because it had a "computer sound" to it. 

Later on in his life, his trigger speed was reduced to 130 presses per ten seconds. In the 2005-12-8 edition of Yaguchihitori show, he was only able to fire 12 shots per second. During the Star Soldier R challenge event in 2008-3-28, he fired at 12.3 shots per second.

In various fiction featuring Takahashi Meijin, the "16 shots per second" milestone became a key plot element.

Appearances

Video games 
He also appeared as a character in Hudson Soft's Hudson's Adventure Island series. In the US and Europe versions of the games, Takahashi's character was renamed "Master Higgins".
Bug-tte Honey
Saturn Bomberman
DreamMix TV World Fighters
Fairy Tail Gekitotsu! Kardia Daiseidō

The Adventure Island character was also turned into an animated series titled Bug-tte Honey.

Guest starring roles in civilian form include:
Quiz Derby
Game Center CX
Pop Jam
Yaguchihitori
Culture SHOwQ
Hyperdimension Neptunia Mk2 (Live action)
Tetris Party Deluxe

Anime 
Running Boy Star Soldier no Himitsu
Bug tte Honey
Gintama Episode 98
Btooom! (Takanohashi)
Barakamon Episode 4

Film 
Game King Takahashi Meijin vs Mouri Meijin

Advertisement 
Hudson Soft: Shooting Watch
Meiji Seika: Falcon High Score and Falcon Impulse ads
Moonstar Shoes:
Sharp: Twin Famicom

References

External links 
  (Defunct)
 https://web.archive.org/web/20040727033752/http://www.hudson.co.jp/hde/vol006/omake/tr16/index.html

 https://www.wired.com/gamelife/2008/10/meet-takahashi/
 http://www.tokyomango.com/tokyo_mango/2008/09/takahashi-meiji.html
 http://www.gamasutra.com/view/feature/3801/the_game_master_speaks_hudsons_.php
 http://www.nintendolife.com/news/2009/03/takahashi_meijin_interview_hudsons_adventure_island

1959 births
Hudson Soft
Living people
People from Sapporo